Santa Maria la Fossa is a comune (municipality) in the Province of Caserta in the Italian region Campania, located about  northwest of Naples and about  west of Caserta.

Santa Maria la Fossa borders the following municipalities: Capua, Casal di Principe, Grazzanise, San Tammaro.

People 
Footballer Attilio Lombardo was born in Santa Maria la Fossa.

References

Cities and towns in Campania